The Cypriot Women's Cup is the national women's football cup competition in Cyprus.

List of finals
The cup was first held in 1998/99. No editions organised by the Cyprus Football Association were played from 2000 to 2002 and 2004 to 2005.

Performance by club

See also
Cypriot Women's Super Cup
Cypriot Cup, men's edition

References

External links
Cup at federation's website

Cyp
Women's football competitions in Cyprus
Women